Antaeotricha ammodes is a moth in the family Depressariidae. It was described by Lord Walsinghamin 1913. It is found in Mexico (Tabasco).

The wingspan is about 15.5 mm. The forewings are rich bright ochreous, unicolorous, except for a few, even more intensely coloured, long scales about the flexus. The hindwings are shining pale yellowish.

References

Moths described in 1913
ammodes
Moths of Central America